Vitrified tile is a ceramic tile with very low porosity. It is an alternative to marble and granite flooring. Vitrified tiles are often used outdoors due to their water and frost resistance. There are four types of Vitrified tiles - Soluble salt, Double charge, Full Body, and Glazed.

Process
Vitrified tile is made by hydraulic pressing a mixture of clay, quartz, feldspar and silica, which make vitreous surface. Thus creating a single mass making them hard with low porosity. Different clay bodies reach vitrification at different temperatures.

Types
 Soluble salt vitrified tiles are screen printed and polished. 
 [https://viterotiles.com/blog/double-charged-vitrified-tiles/ Double charge vitrified tiles] are fed through a press that prints the pattern with a double layer of pigment, 3 to 4 mm thicker than other types of  tile. This process does not permit complex patterns but results in a long-wearing tile surface, suitable for heavy traffic commercial projects. The design layer should not be more than 4mm thickness, which may weaken the strength of the tile.
 Full body vitrified tiles have pigment in entire body (thickness) of the tile. This makes chips and scratches less noticeable and make this an ideal choice for high traffic zones, but the process significantly increases the cost.
 Glazed vitrified tiles (GVT) have a glazed surface. They offer a wide variety of design, art work and surface textures like  wood grain, bamboo, slate or stone. This is also an expensive process, but the cost is dropping as digital printing techniques are introduced

References

Building materials
Visual arts materials
Tiling